Bali River Scenic Area is a AAAAA tourist attraction located in Balihe Town,  Yingshang County, Fuyang, Anhui. It borders the Huai River to the south and the Ying River to the east.

References

Tourist attractions in Anhui
Fuyang
Parks in Anhui
Yingshang County